The 2018 Telkom Knockout was the 37th edition of the Telkom Knockout, a South African cup competition comprising the 16 teams in the Premier Soccer League. It took place between October and December 2018, and was won by Baroka, their first-ever major title. The first-place prize money was R4 million.

Results

First round

Quarterfinals

Semifinals

Final

References 

Telkom Knockout
2018 in South African sport